Drawdown: The Most Comprehensive Plan Ever Proposed to Reverse Global Warming is a 2017 book created, written, and edited by Paul Hawken about climate change mitigation. Other writers include Katharine Wilkinson, and the foreword was written by (hardback edition) Tom Steyer and (paperback) Prince Charles.

The book describes solutions arranged in order by broad categories: energy, food, women and girls, buildings and cities, land use, transport, materials, and "coming attractions". The book provides a list of 100 potential solutions and ranks them by the potential amount of greenhouse gases each could cut, with cost estimates and short descriptions.

The Guardian notes that the author has had influence in corporate sustainability efforts and that companies such as Interface and Autodesk have backed the project. It was intended that the book be supplemented with an online database, Project Drawdown, which was to compile the numerous types of solutions.

Reception 
Drawdown has been a New York Times bestseller and has received favorable reviews. For example, Kirkus Reviews called the book "an optimistic program for getting out of our current mess". 

An April 2017 video on C-SPAN described the book as "a collection of policies, plans, and active programs to reduce carbon emissions outside of the purview of the federal government". In the video, Mr. Hawken stated, "the reason we can say 'the most comprehensive plan ever proposed' is that no one's ever proposed a plan... which is sort of astonishing when you think about it." According to an article in Vox, "until 2017, there was no real way for ordinary people to get an understanding of what they can do and what impact it can have".

See also 

 Drawdown (climate)analysis designed to operationalize themes found in the book

References

External links 
 
 , Project Drawdown headquartered in San Francisco, USA
  the Drawdown Europe Research Association project headquartered in Amsterdam, the Netherlands

2017 non-fiction books
Climate change mitigation
Sustainable development
Climate change books
2017 in the environment
Penguin Books books